Kenneth Charles Bloxham (4 January 1954 – 10 October 2000) was a New Zealand rugby union footballer.

Career
Born and educated in Milton, Bloxham represented the local Tokomairiro club, and won a place in the  provincial side from 1974 to 1986, playing as hooker. He captained Otago between 1980 and 1982.

He briefly represented New Zealand in 1980 when he was called on as a replacement player during that year's tour of Fiji. He played in two matches, including the international against Fiji, but the game was not given full test status by the New Zealand Rugby Union.

Bloxham died of cancer in Dunedin on 10 October 2000.

References

1954 births
2000 deaths
People from Milton, New Zealand
People educated at Tokomairiro High School
New Zealand rugby union players
New Zealand international rugby union players
Otago rugby union players
Rugby union hookers
Deaths from cancer in New Zealand
Rugby union players from Otago